One Life Is Not Enough is an autobiography by K. Natwar Singh, former Minister of External Affairs and senior Indian National Congress politician. An account of his career as a politician and bureaucrat, the book tells about his experiences in Delhi's political corridors and sets the record straight on several events, including the volcker controversy and Sonia Gandhi withdrawal as a prime minister candidate.

Ahead of its release, the book caused controversy in Delhi political circles, so much so that Sonia Gandhi responded by saying that she will write her own book to reveal the truth.

Summary of the book
Singh describes these events and the ups and downs of the Congress party. His association with the party allowed him to observe some of the historical events closely, and he talks about Pakistan in the 1980s, under the rule of Pakistan President Zia-ul-Haq, India–Russia relations and China–India relations among other sensitive developments. He also gives previously unknown details of the Volcker controversy, as well as inside information on major occurrences during the UPA regime.

References

Further reading

2014 non-fiction books
Indian autobiographies
Political autobiographies
Manmohan Singh administration
Books about politics of India
Rupa Publications books
21st-century Indian books